The Canadian Screen Award for Best Host in a Children's or Youth Program or Series was a Canadian television award that honored performances in English language non-fiction children's television produced in Canada. Both adult performers and child actors were eligible for the award.

It was presented by the Gemini Awards from 2008 to 2011, and by the Canadian Screen Awards from 2011 to 2016, but has since been discontinued.

Winners and nominees 
Winners in bold.

2000s

2008
  Bob McDonald - Heads Up! ("What Will Cars Look Like in the Future?")
 Joe MacLeod - Ghost Trackers ("Terror in the Tunnel: Castle Loma Coach House")
 Patty Sullivan - Kids' Canada: I Care
 André Simoneau - Prank Patrol ("Principal's Office")
 Mark Sykes - Mark's Moments ("Max")

2009
  Araya Mengesha - Mystery Hunters ("Mysterious Legends: Ark of the Covenant")
 T.J. Samuel and Tristan Samuel - Are We There Yet?: World Adventure ("New Zealand – Maori")
 Sabrina Jalees - In Real Life ("Hollywood Stunt Performers")
 Patty Sullivan - Kids' Canada
 Mark Sykes - Mark's Moments ("Sydney")

2010s

2010
  Patty Sullivan - Kids' Canada ("Patty Sullivan")
 Evan Solomon - Canada's Super Speller ("1X04")
 Adamo Ruggiero - The Next Star ("Edmonton/Vancouver")
 Mark Sykes - Mark's Moments ("Alexandre Baronette")

2011
  Jeremie Saunders - Artzooka! ("Episode 111")
 Adamo Ruggiero - The Next Star ("Decades")
 Gisèle Corinthios - Gisèle's Big Backyard ("Big Backyard Community")

2012
  Jeremie Saunders - Artzooka! ("Episode 218")
 Adam Christie - Zoink'd! ("To Be Zany or To Be Zoink'd")
 Gisèle Corinthios - Gisèle's Big Backyard ("Movie Moments - Long 1")
 Michael Lagimodiere - Giver ("Guelph - Circus Park")
 Adamo Ruggiero - The Next Star ("Auditions 1")

2013
  Carlos Bustamante - The Next Star ("Auditions Part 3")
 Andrew Chapman - Extreme Babysitting
 Bradford How - The Grizzly Cup ("Part 1")

2014
  Yannick Bisson - The Adventures of Napkin Man ("Just Me in a Tree")
 Carlos Bustamante - The Next Star ("Live Finale")
 Kara Harun - TVOKids: The Space ("Princess P Pie Day")
 Lisa Gilroy - Undercover High ("He Toots He Scores and No Plane No Gain")

2015
  Harrison Houde - Finding Stuff Out ("Poop")
 Michael Lagimodiere - Giver ("Amherstburg: Sports Park")
 Kara Harun - TVOKids: The Space ("Animal Day")

References 

Host, children's